The spotted shovelnose ray (Aptychotrema timorensis) is a species of fish in the Rhinobatidae family. It is endemic to northern Australia.  Its natural habitat is open seas.

Sources

spotted shovelnose ray
Fauna of the Northern Territory
Vulnerable fauna of Australia
spotted shovelnose ray
Taxonomy articles created by Polbot